Mitchel Oviedo Hernández (born July 7, 1988, in Veracruz, Veracruz, Mexico) is a former Mexican footballer who last played as a midfielder for Celaya F.C. of the Ascenso MX.

Career
Oviedo came from the youth squads of Guadalajara. He only managed to play one official match with the club and he was featured mainly in the reserve squads. After many loan stints, he officially signed with Veracruz in January 2015.

References

1988 births
Living people
Footballers from Veracruz
C.D. Guadalajara footballers
Querétaro F.C. footballers
Liga MX players
Mexican footballers
Association football midfielders